Chondrodactylus fitzsimonsi, also known as Fitzsimons's thick-toed gecko or the button-scaled gecko, is a species of gecko, a lizard in the family Gekkonidae. The species is endemic to southwestern Africa.

Etymology
The specific name, fitzsimonsi, is in honor of South African herpetologist Vivian Frederick Maynard FitzSimons.

Geographic range
C. fitzsimonsi is found in Angola and Namibia.

Description
C. fitzsimonsi is a large, heavy-bodied gecko. Adults average  snout-to-vent length (SVL). The record size is a male  SVL. Dorsally, it is olive-colored, with four or five dark undulating crossbands. Ventrally, it is white.

Habitat
The preferred habitat of C. fitzsimonsi is rocky outcrops in arid savanna or in semidesert.

References

Further reading
Bauer AM, Lamb T (2005). "Phylogenetic relationships of southern African geckos in the Pachydactylus group (Squamata: Gekkonidae)". African J. Herpetol. 54 (2): 105–129. (Chondrodactylus fitzsimonsi, new combination).
Loveridge A (1947). "Revision of the African Lizards of the Family Gekkonidae". Bull. Mus. Comp. Zool. Harvard 98 (1): 1-46. (Pachydactylus laevigatus fitzsimonsi, new name, pp. 400–401).

Chondrodactylus
Reptiles described in 1947